Basma El Ghouate (born 21 March 2002) is a French former professional racing cyclist, who most recently rode for Macogep Tornatech Girondins de Bordeaux. She has also worked as a fashion photographer and stylist.

References

External links

Living people
French female cyclists
2002 births
French photographers
French sportspeople of Moroccan descent